Mohamed Lamine Ouattara (born 14 June 1998) is a professional footballer who plays as a striker for JS Kabylie. Born in the Ivory Coast, he represents the Burkina Faso national team.

International career
Born in the Ivory Coast, Ouattara is of Burkinabé descent. He debuted for the Burkina Faso national team in a 1–0 2020 African Nations Championship loss to Mali on 16 January 2021.

References

External links
 
 

1998 births
Living people
People from Lagunes District
Citizens of Burkina Faso through descent
Burkinabé footballers
Burkina Faso international footballers
Ivorian footballers
Ivorian people of Burkinabé descent
Sportspeople of Burkinabé descent
Burkinabé Premier League players
Association football forwards
21st-century Burkinabé people
Burkina Faso A' international footballers
2020 African Nations Championship players
Expatriate footballers in Algeria
Burkinabé expatriate sportspeople in Algeria
Burkinabé expatriate footballers
JS Kabylie players